= Markham Building =

Late Victorian building in South Africa

Coordinates: 26°12′10.3″S 28°2′36.3″E

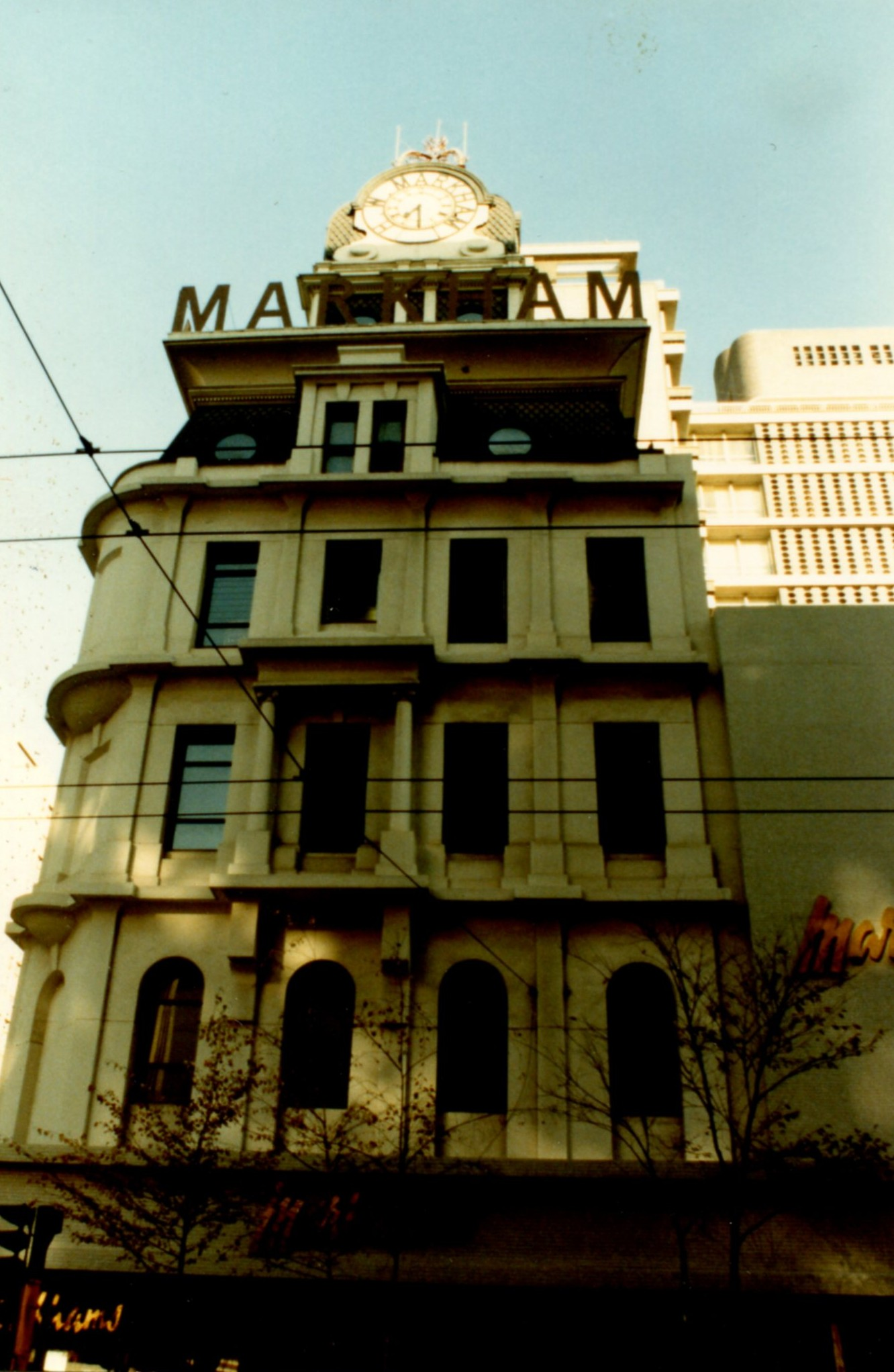

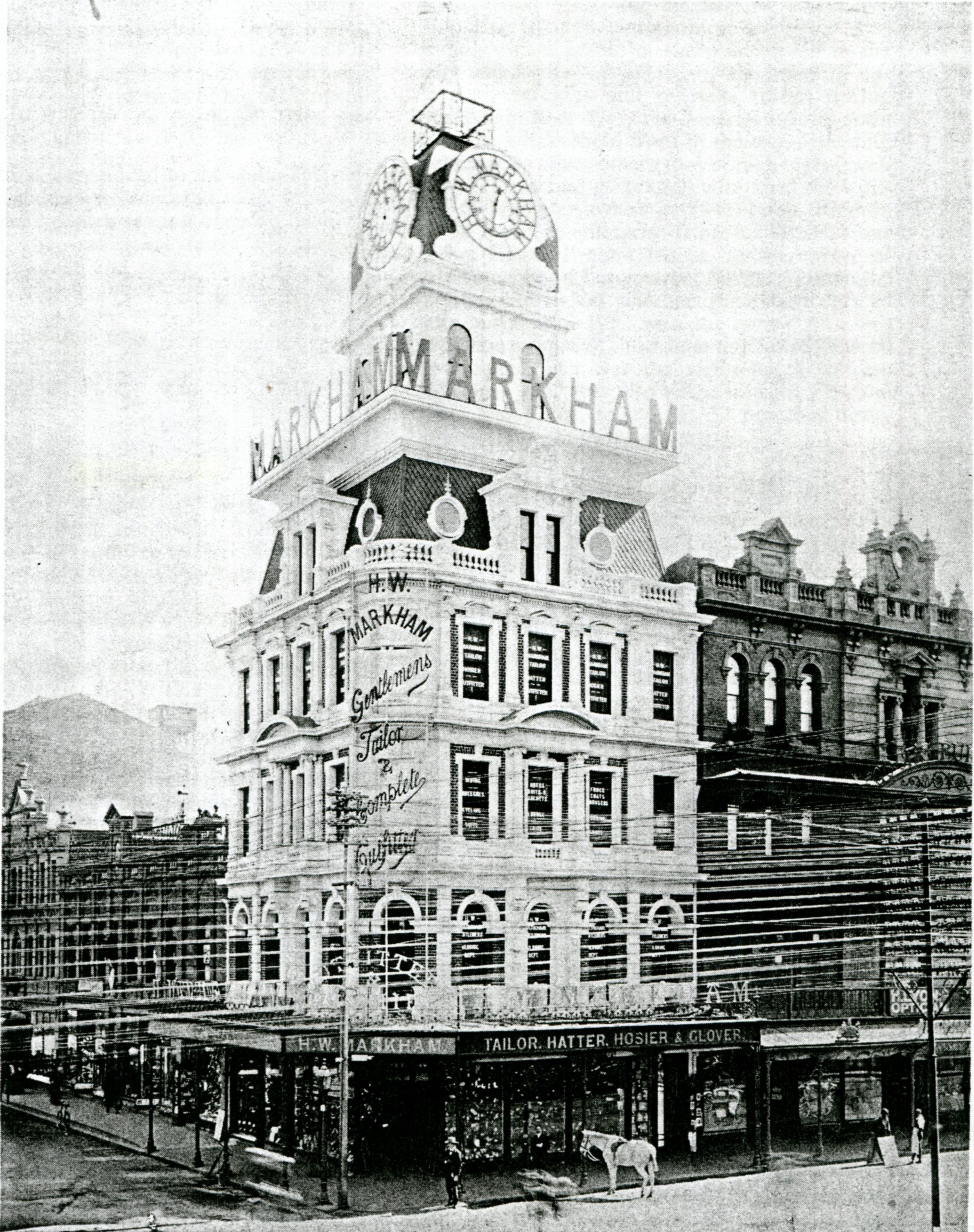
The building soon after its completion

The Markham Building is a building in Johannesburg, South Africa, which when completed in 1897 was the tallest building in the city. The six-storey building has a clock tower housing a large clock imported from Scotland, with four faces. In the clock tower there was an artist studio. The building was known as "Markham's Folly" because it stood out clearly in the centre of Johannesburg. It was saved from demolition in 1978.

== History ==
Built in the late Victorian style of architecture, the building was owned by Henry William Markham, who arrived in Cape Town from England in 1873. He set up a successful outfitter's business and in 1895 decided to open a branch in Johannesburg. After Henry's death, his son-in-law took over the business.

== Architecture ==
The Markham Building was designed by George Ransome, a Cape Town architect who had previously designed the Cape Town Markham's store. The building features a Second Empire-style roof, quite unique in Johannesburg. The steeply slanted plate metal roofing and porthole windows give the building a Parisian feel.
